Predrag Mužijević is a Bosnian pianist.

He shared with Benjamin Frith the 1986 Concorso Busoni's 2nd prize, with the first prize being declared void. Mužijević has an international concert career. He lives in the United States, where he has recorded nine CDs.

References
 Fondazione Concorso Pianistico Internazionale Ferruccio Busoni
 ArkivMusic - Pedja Muzijevic
 MSR Classics

Bosnia and Herzegovina classical pianists
Living people
21st-century classical pianists
Year of birth missing (living people)